Pajama Sam: Life Is Rough When You Lose Your Stuff! (also known as Pajama Sam 4) is a computer game for children.

Sam's Pajama Man comic book is lost in a strange world, where he meets a dirty sock who needs to get to his other sock, who is clean. He goes on a journey to find a way to clean the dirty sock and to find clothes (a shirt, shoes, and the socks) to get to Grubby Corners Mall, where his comic has found its way to. In this game, Pajama Sam's voice is provided by Elisha Ferguson rather than Pamela Adlon. This is the only Pajama Sam game without a demo, possibly because the game was only released after Atari's takeover along with Putt-Putt: Pep's Birthday Surprise.

Plot
Sam watches Pajama Man on TV. Suddenly, he sees a breaking news story announcing that Pajama Man is coming live, in person, at the local shopping mall to sign autographs. Excited, Sam asks his mom if he can go. After she agrees, Sam goes to get his "Rare Pajama Man Issue No. 1" comic book for the autograph. While looking for it in his messy room, Sam finds the comic book being pulled into a big pile of junk. After finding his cape in all the messy buildup, Sam leaps into the junk pile and falls into the land of junk.

Shortly after entering the land of junk, Sam encounters a dirty sock, who explains in a song that he was kicked out of his dresser's drawer and not allowed to be with his matching sock (and best friend) due to his filth. When Sam tells the sock about his missing comic book, the sock says that he saw a half-eaten cheese sandwich with that comic book to get it signed by Dr. Grime (Pajama Man's arch enemy) at the Grubby Corners Mall. Sam agrees to find a way to get the dirty sock clean and reunite him with his friend, as well as try to get into the mall. 

When Sam tries to enter the mall, the mall guard stops him, telling him about the "no shirt, no shoes, no socks, no service" rule, in which he must get a shirt (pajamas don't count), shoes and socks for the mall's strict dress code to enter the mall. Eventually, Sam is able to wash the dirty sock in Agitator Lake and reunite him with his friend, catch a pair of shoes with a net and have Grandma Sweater knit a shirt for him. He takes his clothes to show to the mall guard, who lets them all enter. 

While at the mall, Sam becomes the 30th customer at Leavins n' Squeezins, the restaurant at the mall, and wins a Prizewinner pass to the head of the line to Dr. Grime. On the way there, however, Sam is mistaken for Dr. Grime by a bunch of Grime fans. He hides in Dr. Grime's dressing room, where he finally finds his comic book. Just as he is about to grab it, Sam is horrified to find dirt all over himself (explaining why he was mistaken for Dr. Grime). Looking around the room, he notices a sprinkler and decides that's the way to get himself clean. Squeezing through an air vent and using a cup of hot cocoa, Sam manages to turn on the sprinkler, which washes off the dirt, while flooding the mall. Once the Dr. Grime fans realize that Sam is not who they thought he was, Sam introduces himself and vows never to be dirty again. Then, he remembers Pajama Man at the mall and hurries with his mother and comic book, finally getting his picture taken with Pajama Man as the game ends.

Development

Soundtrack
The score was composed and produced by Nathan Rosenberg (The Doghouse NYC Studios). Much time and funds were invested in the music composition to accompany the gameplay. Latin was the desired genre for the game with over 45 minutes of soundtrack and optimum quality using real instruments. The solution to retain quality, time and budget was hiring drummer John Bollinger who used a number of syncing techniques to get the music just right. After two days of composing several soundtracks, saxophonist Tom Glusac was hired to add finishing touches to the soundtrack. Thus all the audio for the game was delivered just in time and under the budget.

Reception
Pajama Sam: Life Is Rough When You Lose Your Stuff! currently has a 90% rating on GameRankings based on one Windows review. IGN currently holds a community score of 8.9/10 based on eight ratings. On the digital gaming distribution platform Steam the user ratings are currently shown as Mostly Negative based on 39+ reviews. On Amazon.com, buyer ratings list 2.5/5 stars.

Pajama Sam: Life Is Rough When You Lose Your Stuff! is generally perceived as a basic and fun children's educational game by those new to the Humongous Entertainment, as well as kindergarten and early elementary school teachers. This is the case for the majority of the other Humongous Entertainment educational games. Fans of Humongous Entertainment before its acquisition by Atari/Infogrames generally have mixed or negative opinions, criticizing lower effort in the game, as well as a new adventure style, art style and voice actor. Most of these critics put blame on Atari/Infogrames.

The game has also received the Silver Honor award from Parents' Choice Award.

See also
 Humongous Entertainment
 Pajama Sam

References

External links
 

Atari games
Adventure games
Humongous Entertainment games
2003 video games
Point-and-click adventure games
Video games developed in the United States
Windows games
Windows-only games
Single-player video games
Children's educational video games
Tommo games